I Take This Woman may refer to:

I Take This Woman (1931 film), a romance film starring Gary Cooper and Carole Lombard
I Take This Woman (1940 film), a drama film about suicide, featuring Spencer Tracy and Hedy Lamarr
"I Take This Woman", a season 5 episode of the TV series The Rifleman
Ek Chadar Maili Si (English translation: I Take This Woman), Rajinder Singh Bedi's Urdu novel